Plutonium phosphide is a binary inorganic compound of plutonium and phosphorus with the formula PuP.

Synthesis
Fusion of excess phosphorus and powdered plutonium, followed by distillation of unreacted phosphorus:
4 Pu + P4 → 4 PuP

Passing phosphine through heated plutonium hydride:
PuH3 + PH3 → PuP + 3 H2

Physical properties
Plutonium phosphide forms black crystals of a cubic system, space group Fm3m, cell parameters a = 0.5660 nm, Z = 4, structure of the NaCl type.

References

Phosphides
Plutonium(III) compounds
Rock salt crystal structure